Koryta  is a village in the administrative district of Gmina Torzym, within Sulęcin County, Lubusz Voivodeship, in western Poland.

The village has a population of 258.

References

Koryta